Dmitrijs Silovs (born 23 March 1989) is a Latvian Paralympic athlete who competes in international track and field competitions, he competes in javelin throw and shot put and was a former long jump. He is a World champion and three-time European champion in the javelin and has won two silver medals in the shot put. He competed at the 2012 Summer Paralympics in the long jump where he finished in ninth place.

References

1989 births
Living people
People from Krāslava
Paralympic athletes of Latvia
Latvian male javelin throwers
Latvian male long jumpers
Latvian male shot putters
Athletes (track and field) at the 2012 Summer Paralympics
Medalists at the World Para Athletics Championships
World Para Athletics Championships winners
Medalists at the World Para Athletics European Championships